Thunder Hawk is an unincorporated community in Corson County, in the U.S. state of South Dakota.

History
A post office called Thunder Hawk was established in 1909, and remained in operation until 1965. The community has the name of a Hunkpapa chief.

References

Unincorporated communities in Corson County, South Dakota
Unincorporated communities in South Dakota
South Dakota placenames of Native American origin